Abigael Tarus is a Kenyan volleyball player.

She was part of the Kenya women's national volleyball team. She competed with the national team at the 2004 Summer Olympics in Athens, Greece. 
She played with the Kenya Pipeline club.

Clubs
  Kenya Pipeline

See also
 Kenya at the 2004 Summer Olympics

References

External links
http://olympicreference.com/olympics/athletes/ta/abigael-tarus-1.html
http://www.directorwww.worldofvolley.com/wov-community/players/48107/abigael-tarus-.html
http://bestsports.com.br/db/atlpag.php?atl=17557&lang=2
http://www.nation.co.ke/sports/1090-309186-view-asAMP-pbdfp1/index.html

Living people
Kenyan women's volleyball players
Place of birth missing (living people)
Volleyball players at the 2004 Summer Olympics
Olympic volleyball players of Kenya
1981 births